Boban Grncharov (born 12 August 1982) is a Macedonian retired footballer who played as a central defender.

Club career

OFK Beograd
Born in Skopje (SR Macedonia, SFR Yugoslavia), Grnčarov began his career playing with FK Vardar.  After playing in their youth team, he made his senior debut in the 1998–99 season of the First Macedonian Football League.  In 2000, he moved to Serbia and signed with OFK Beograd.  By then he had already been a regular in the U-16, U-18 and U-21 national team levels his regular appearances in the First League of FR Yugoslavia at his first season with OFK made him earn his debut for the Macedonia national football team at the young age of 20. Despite his age, he has been a regular in the league starting line-up during those seasons in Belgrade, and following the success of his signing, OFK had turned their attention to the Macedonian market and, by the 2002–03 season, 5 other Macedonians were playing in OFK along Grnčarov: Bajevski, Despotovski, Fakić, Kirovski and Panov. During the previous seasons the club had been struggling to maintain consistency and Grnčarov became one of the fundamental players in the 2002–03 season when OFK finished the season in 3rd place and archive to qualify for European competitions after exactly 30 years of their last continental competition appearance.  Boban Grnčarov had played a total of 53 league matches, and scored 2 goals, at the time he left OFK Beograd.

In 2003, he moved to Ukraine and signed with Metalurh Donetsk where he played until 2006. After spending the first half of the 2006–07 season on loan to FC Stal Alchevsk, Grncarov signed a deal with KAA Gent in the Belgian Jupiler League. The season 2008–09 he moved on loan to Maccabi Petah Tikva.

APOEL
In June 2009, the board of APOEL announced that the player signed a two-year contract with the club. In his first season in Cyprus, he won the Super Cup (he scored a goal in the Super Cup final) and he also appeared in four official group stage matches of the 2009–10 UEFA Champions League with APOEL. The next season, he became an essential member of APOEL and – although he played in all matches as a central defender – he scored 6 goals in the league (all goals scored by head), helping his team to win the 2010–11 Cypriot First Division. In May 2011, Grnčarov left APOEL after two years, when the club and the player did not agree on signing a new contract due to financial reasons.

Lierse
On 5 July 2011, Grnčarov signed a one-year deal with Lierse with an option for an additional season.

Botev Plovdiv
On 3 July 2012, Grncharov signed a three-year contract with Botev Plovdiv of the Bulgarian A PFG. On 9 March 2013, he scored the opening goal for Botev Plovdiv in the 2:0 milestone home win (the first one in 16 years) over Levski Sofia. In the end of 2013 Grncarov was removed from the first team after a scandal with the sports director of Botev Aleksandar Aleksandrov. During the winter break Grncharov's contract was mutually terminated and after spending some time as a free agent, in mid January 2014 he joined Tavriya Simferopol in the Ukrainian Premier League.

International career
He made his senior debut for Macedonia in a December 2001 friendly match against Oman and has earned a total of 34 caps, scoring 1 goal against Norway on 9 September 2009. His final international was a May 2014 friendly against Qatar.

International goals
Scores and results list Macedonia's goal tally first.

Honours

APOEL
 Cypriot First Division: 2010–11
 Cypriot Super Cup: 2009

References

External links 
 Profile at Macedonian Football 
 
 
 

1982 births
Living people
Footballers from Skopje
Association football defenders
Macedonian footballers
North Macedonia international footballers
North Macedonia under-21 international footballers
FK Vardar players
OFK Beograd players
FC Metalurh Donetsk players
FC Metalurh-2 Donetsk players
FC Stal Alchevsk players
K.A.A. Gent players
Maccabi Petah Tikva F.C. players
APOEL FC players
Lierse S.K. players
Botev Plovdiv players
SC Tavriya Simferopol players
Macedonian First Football League players
First League of Serbia and Montenegro players
Ukrainian Premier League players
Ukrainian Second League players
Belgian Pro League players
Israeli Premier League players
Cypriot First Division players
First Professional Football League (Bulgaria) players
Macedonian expatriate footballers
Expatriate footballers in Serbia and Montenegro
Macedonian expatriate sportspeople in Serbia and Montenegro
Expatriate footballers in Ukraine
Macedonian expatriate sportspeople in Ukraine
Expatriate footballers in Belgium
Macedonian expatriate sportspeople in Belgium
Expatriate footballers in Israel
Macedonian expatriate sportspeople in Israel
Expatriate footballers in Cyprus
Macedonian expatriate sportspeople in Cyprus
Expatriate footballers in Bulgaria
Macedonian expatriate sportspeople in Bulgaria